Cyperus enervis is a species of sedge that is endemic to eastern Australia.

The species was first formally described by the botanist Robert Brown in 1810 as a part of the work Prodromus florae Novae Hollandiae et insulae Van-Diemen, exhibens characteres plantarum quas annis 1802-1805.

See also
 List of Cyperus species

References

enervis
Taxa named by Robert Brown (botanist, born 1773)
Plants described in 1810
Flora of Queensland
Flora of New South Wales